Dudley was a parliamentary constituency centred on the town of Dudley in Worcestershire (now in the West Midlands).

It returned one Member of Parliament (MP) to the House of Commons of the Parliament of the United Kingdom, elected by the first past the post system.

History
The borough of Dudley returned two members to Parliament in 1294, Benedict Andrew and Ralph Clerk de Duddlegh, but not to any subsequent one.

The constituency was created by the Reform Act 1832 for the 1832 general election. It was abolished for the February 1974 general election, when it was replaced by the new Dudley East and Dudley West constituencies, which expanded beyond the town's historic boundaries to include Coseley and part of Sedgley in Dudley East (previously in the old Bilston constituency), as well as Kingswinford, Brierley Hill, and the remainder of Sedgley in Dudley West. All of these areas had been incorporated into the Dudley borough in 1966.

Boundaries
1918–1950: The County Borough of Dudley, and the parish of Dudley Castle Hill.

1950–1974: The County Borough of Dudley, and the Borough of Stourbridge.

Members of Parliament

Elections

Elections in the 1830s

Campbell was appointed as Attorney General for England and Wales, requiring a by-election.

Elections in the 1840s

Hawkes resigned by accepting the office of Steward of the Chiltern Hundreds, causing a by-election.

Elections in the 1850s

Benbow's death caused a by-election.

Elections in the 1860s

Elections in the 1870s

The election was declared void on petition, causing a by-election.

Elections in the 1880s

Elections in the 1890s

Elections in the 1900s

Elections in the 1910s 

General Election 1914–15:

Another General Election was required to take place before the end of 1915. The political parties had been making preparations for an election to take place and by the July 1914, the following candidates had been selected; 
Unionist: Arthur Griffith-Boscawen
Liberal: Gilbert Beyfus

Elections in the 1920s

Elections in the 1930s

Elections in the 1940s 
General Election 1939–40

Another General Election was required to take place before the end of 1940. The political parties had been making preparations for an election to take place and by the Autumn of 1939, the following candidates had been selected; 
Conservative: Dudley Joel
Labour: Leonard Freedman

Elections in the 1950s

Elections in the 1960s

Elections in the 1970s

See also
 List of parliamentary constituencies in Dudley

References

Politics of Dudley
Parliamentary constituencies in the West Midlands (county) (historic)
Parliamentary constituencies in Worcestershire (historic)
Constituencies of the Parliament of the United Kingdom established in 1832
Constituencies of the Parliament of the United Kingdom disestablished in 1974